Yukon Flight  (also known as Renfrew of the Royal Mounted in Yukon Flight) is a 1940 American Western film directed by Ralph Staub and starring James Newill, Louise Stanley, Dave O'Brien and William Pawley. Released by Monogram Pictures, the film uses a musical/action formula, similar to the format of the "singing cowboy" films of the era.

Plot
When an aircraft from the Yukon and Columbia Mail Service crashes, Sergeant Renfrew (James Newill) and Constable Kelly (Dave O'Brien), of the Royal Canadian Mounted Police, suspect murder because they find the control stick jammed. Louise Howard (Louise Stanley), a mine owner reports that her superintendent is missing. When he is found murdered, it also is made to look like an accident.

The new mail service pilot, Bill Shipley (Warren Hull), had trained with Renfrew, is a good pilot but reckless. The Mounties find Louise's  assistant Raymond (Karl Hackett) owns the airline managed by "Yuke Cardoe" (William Pawley) and both men had been stealing gold from the mine. They have been shipping it to Seattle by aircraft. When Renfrew sets a trap, Yuke and Raymond panic and try to escape in their aircraft, but Renfrew and Shipley bring them down, after which, Renfrew makes a recommendation for Shipley to join the Royal Canadian Mounted Police as a new pilot.

Cast

 James Newill as Sgt. Renfrew
 Louise Stanley as Louise Howard
 Warren Hull as Bill Shipley
 William Pawley as "Yuke" Gradeau
 George Humbert as Nick
 Karl Hackett as Raymond
 Jack Clifford as "Whispering Smith"
 Roy Barcroft as Lodin
 Bob Terry as DeLong
 Earl Douglas as "Smokey" Joe

Production
All of the Renfrew pictures were made miles from the sheltered enclosure of Hollywood sound stages. Cameras were set up where there was tall timber and deep blue mountain lakes and no stage-door guards. Shooting pictures under such conditions very often led to unusual situations. According to a press release (to be taken with a grain of salt), “In the making of the latest Renfrew picture, Yukon Flight, the Monogram troupe had to stop working on the picture for several days to help forest rangers put out a forest fire. Then a few days later, James Newill saved a little girl from drowning.”

Yukon Flight was the first of three Renfrew movies to be directed by Ralph Staub, whose credits included producing a lengthy on-going series of film shorts known as Screen Snapshots (1930–1958) and a number of Gene Autry westerns at Republic. Three of Staub’s Screen Snapshots were nominated for an Academy Award, and he remains the only director in the Renfrew film franchise to have a star on the Hollywood Walk of Fame.

Sergeant Renfrew of the Royal Mounted was a character created by Laurie York Erskine in 1922 and continued in books, stories and on radio for many years. Yukon Flight was one of three films based on the Laurie York Erskine novel Renfrew Rides North. The others were Renfrew on the Great White Trail (1938) and Murder on the Yukon (1940). Some scenes were shot at Big Bear Lake, California, standing in for the Yukon. Renfrew's character flies a Waco RNF (N617Y) while other aircraft include a Waco RNF (NC860V) and a Travel Air 4000 (c/n 868, NC9087). A Curtiss Fledgling is used as a camera aircraft.

Soundtrack
"Mounted Men"  and "The Old Grey Goose" (written by Betty Laidlaw and Robert Lively) was sung by James Newill.

Reception
Yukon Flight was not reviewed in trade sources. It was followed by Sky Bandits, another in the series of Renfrew of the Royal Mounted films.

See also
 Renfrew of the Mounted (1937 film)
 On the Great White Trail (1938 film)
 Sky Bandits (1940 film)

References

Notes

Citations

Bibliography

 Pendo, Stephen. Aviation in the Cinema. Lanham, Maryland: Scarecrow Press, 1985. .

External links
 
 
 Film Archive: Yukon Flight

1940 films
American aviation films
1940 Western (genre) films
1940s English-language films
American black-and-white films
Films based on American novels
Films directed by Ralph Staub
American Western (genre) films
Royal Canadian Mounted Police in fiction
1940s American films